Clodhopper may refer to:

 Clodhopper (candy)
 The Clodhopper, a 1917 American comedy drama film 
 Clodhopper, a dune buggy body by Fiberfab
 Clodhopper, a 1997 album by Glueleg
 "Clodhopper", a song by Th' Legendary Shack Shakers from the 2003 album Cockadoodledon't
 "Clodhopper", a song by Radarmaker from the 2006 album Drawn like Spires

See also
 Binkley Brothers' Dixie Clodhoppers, an American Old-time string band 
 Agrōstīnos ('The Country-Dweller' or 'Clodhopper'), a work by Epicharmus of Kos